S. A. Rajkumar is an Indian composer and lyricist. He has made music for all South Indian language films in Tamil, Malayalam, Telugu, and Kannada.

Early life 
Rajkumar's father was a vocalist performing in stage shows conducted by popular music directors such as Ilayaraja, Gangai Amaren, Deva among others. Rajkumar admired his father's musical career and developed an interest in music. It was his mother who encouraged his father to make him join music classes. Rajkumar underwent classical music training under the guidance of Subbaiah Bhagavathar for 3 years.

Career 
After completion of his music training, Rajkumar started to organize musical shows on his own and was in search for film opportunities. Come 1987 and director duo Robert–Rajasekar gave him his first major breakthrough by signing him as the music composer for their film Chinna Poove Mella Pesu . Since then, Rajkumar has composed music for over hundred films in Tamil, Malayalam, Telugu and Kannada language films. His compositions for the films such as Pudhu Vasantham (1990), Shruthi (1990), Poove Unakkaga (1996), Surya Vamsam (1997),  Aval Varuvala (1998), Unnidathil Ennai Koduthen (1998), Thulladha Manamum Thullum (1999), Raja (1999), Vaanathaippola (2000), Vasantam (2000) and  Priyamaana Thozhi (2003) have all been blockbuster musical hits.

Awards 
 1990 – Filmfare Award for Best Music Director – Tamil – Pudhu Vasantham
 1990 – Filmfare Award for Best Music Director – Kannada – Shruthi
 1999 – Filmfare Award for Best Music Director – Telugu – Raja 
 1997 – Tamil Nadu State Film Award for Best Music Director – Suryavamsam

Filmography

Tamil cinema

Telugu cinema

Kannada cinema 
 Shruthi (1990) Filmfare Award for Best Music Director – Kannada
 Gowri Kalyana (1991)
 Maduve(1997)
 Jodi (2001)
 Chandra Chakori (2003)
 Rama Krishna (2004)
 Kanchana Ganga (2004)
 Jyeshta (2004)
 Gowramma (2005)
 Love Story (2005)
 Sirivantha (2006)
 Thandege Thakka Maga (2006)
 Sevanthi Sevanthi (2006)
 Thayiya Madilu (2007)
 Preethigagi (2007)
 Gokula Krishna (2012)

Malayalam cinema 
 Vesham (2004)
 Villali Veeran (2014)

Television 
 2010 Kodi Mullai

Onscreen appearances 
Pudhu Varusham (1992) – guest role in song "Ovvorthanum Kaadhalikkiren"
Unnidathil Ennai Koduthen (1998) – himself in song "Vaanambadiyin Vaazhvile"
Endrendrum Kadhal (1999) – himself in song "Nadodi Nanba"
Ennavale (2000) – himself
Priyamanavale (2000) – himself

Singer

References

External links 
 

Musicians from Chennai
Kannada film score composers
Living people
Tamil Nadu State Film Awards winners
Filmfare Awards South winners
Tamil film score composers
Telugu film score composers
1964 births